Henry "Harry" Varley (25 November 1867 – 21 November 1915) was an English rugby union and professional rugby league footballer who played in the 1880s and 1890s, and coached rugby league in the 1890s. Prior to Thursday 29 August 1895, Liversedge was a rugby union club.

Background
Harry Varley was born in Cleckheaton/Bradford (see note), West Riding of Yorkshire, England, and he died aged 47 in Oldham, Lancashire, England.

Playing career

International honours
Harry Varley played for Liversedge (24.12.1887 v Kirkstall-?) P44.
He won a cap for England (RU) while at Liversedge in the 1892 Home Nations Championship against Scotland.

County honours
Harry Varley won caps for Yorkshire (RU) while at Liversedge, and won caps for Lancashire (RL) while at Oldham.

Change of Code
When Liversedge converted from the rugby union code to the rugby league code on Thursday 29 August 1895, Harry Varley would have been 28 years of age. Consequently, he may have been both a rugby union, and rugby league footballer for Liversedge, he played rugby league for Oldham until 1897 when he became their coach, and he came out of retirement in 1899 to play for Leeds.

Coaching career

Challenge Cup Final appearances
Harry Varley was the coach in Oldham's 19-9 victory over Hunslet in 1899 Challenge Cup Final during the 1898–99 season at Fallowfield Stadium, Manchester, in front of a crowd of 15,763, and as a mark of appreciation the Oldham players paid to have a special medal struck, that bore the Oldham coat of arms and a Challenge Cup related inscription.

Note
ESPN states Harry Varley's birthplace as being Cleckheaton, whereas FreeBMD.com quotes it as being registered 6-miles away in Bradford.

References

External links
 (archived by web.archive.org) Statistics at orl-heritagetrust.org.uk
The people’s game
Search for "Harry Varley" at britishnewspaperarchive.co.uk
Search for "Henry Varley" at britishnewspaperarchive.co.uk

1867 births
1915 deaths
England international rugby union players
English rugby league coaches
English rugby league players
English rugby union players
Lancashire rugby league team players
Leeds Rhinos players
Liversedge RFC players
Oldham R.L.F.C. captains
Oldham R.L.F.C. coaches
Oldham R.L.F.C. players
People from Cleckheaton
Rugby league five-eighths
Rugby league halfbacks
Rugby league players from Bradford
Rugby union players from Bradford
Rugby union scrum-halves
Yorkshire County RFU players